Cosmetra is a genus of moths belonging to the subfamily Olethreutinae of the family Tortricidae.

Species

Cosmetra accipitrina  (Meyrick, 1913)
Cosmetra anepenthes  (Razowski & Trematerra, 2010)
Cosmetra anthophaga Diakonoff, 1977
Cosmetra brunnescens  Razowski, 2014
Cosmetra calliarma  (Meyrick, 1909)
Cosmetra fibigeri  Aarvik, 2016
Cosmetra juu  Aarvik, 2016
Cosmetra larseni  Aarvik, 2016
Cosmetra latiloba (Razowski & Trematerra, 2010)
Cosmetra multidentata  Aarvik, 2016
Cosmetra nereidopa  (Meyrick, 1927)
Cosmetra neka  Razowski & Brown, 2009
Cosmetra podocarpivora  Razowski & Brown, 2012
Cosmetra rythmosema Diakonoff, 1992
Cosmetra spiculifera  (Meyrick, 1913)
Cosmetra taitana  Razowski & Brown, 2012
Cosmetra thalameuta  (Meyrick, 1918)
Cosmetra truncana  Aarvik, 2016
Cosmetra tumulata  (Meyrick, 1908)
Cosmetra usumbarensis  Aarvik, 2016

See also
List of Tortricidae genera

References
Razowski & Brown, 2009. Records of Tortricidae from the Afrotropical Region, with Descriptions of New Taxa (Lepidoptera: Tortricidae). SHILAP Revista de Lepidopterología, vol. 37, (147): 371-384
Razowski & Brown, 2012. Descriptions of new Tortricidae (Lepidoptera) reared from native fruit in Kenya. Zootaxa 3222: 1-27

External links
tortricidae.com

Tortricidae genera
Olethreutinae
Taxa named by Alexey Diakonoff